Mictopsichia jamaicana is a species of moth of the family Tortricidae. It is found in Jamaica.

The wingspan is about 14.5 mm. The ground colour of the forewings is pale orange yellow (almost completely suffused olive grey) up to the mid-costa and the end of the termen. The ground colour in the terminal third of the wing is orange. There are bluish-silver refractive markings. The hindwings are orange, mixed with brown on the periphery.

Etymology
The name refers to the country of origin, Jamaica.

References

Moths described in 2009
Mictopsichia
Moths of the Caribbean
Taxa named by Józef Razowski